Paweł Rusek (born 21 January 1983) is a Polish professional volleyball coach and former player. The current head coach of Cuprum Lubin.

Honours
 FIVB Club World Championship
  Doha 2011 – with Jastrzębski Węgiel
 CEV Challenge Cup
  2008/2009 – with Jastrzębski Węgiel
 National championships
 2005/2006  Polish Championship, with Jastrzębski Węgiel
 2006/2007  Polish Championship, with Jastrzębski Węgiel
 2009/2010  Polish Cup, with Jastrzębski Węgiel
 2009/2010  Polish Championship, with Jastrzębski Węgiel

Individual awards
 2009: CEV Challenge Cup – Best Receiver
 2010: Polish Cup – Best Defender

References

External links
 
 Player profile at PlusLiga.pl 
 Player profile at Volleybox.net

1983 births
Living people
People from Rybnik
Polish men's volleyball players
Polish volleyball coaches
Jastrzębski Węgiel players
Trefl Gdańsk players
Cuprum Lubin players
Resovia (volleyball) players
Cuprum Lubin coaches
Liberos